Malviya Nagar is an affluent residential locality in South Delhi with property prices over 17,000 per sqft. It known for its huge market which has various upscale restaurants and shops. It is between Saket and Hauz Khas and close to IIT Delhi. It is named after the freedom fighter Madan Mohan Malviya who was also an educator and founded Banaras Hindu University.

Malviya Nagar was initially populated in the 1950s by refugees from Pakistan, after the Partition of India.  A large portion of the population were ethnic Rajasthani, U.P., Haryanvi, Punjabis and Sindhis, as well as Afghan refugees who arrived during the Soviet–Afghan War in 1971.

Today, Malviya Nagar is bounded by Panchsheel Enclave in the north, Sheikh Sarai in the east, Saket in the south and Sarvapriya Vihar in the west. Enclaves that are part of Malviya Nagar include Geetanjali Enclave, Bhavishya Nidhi Enclave, Begumpur, Shivalik colony, Sarvodaya Enclave, MMTC Colony and Adchini.

It is serviced by the Malviya Nagar station located on the Yellow Line of the Delhi Metro.   Malviya Nagar is also home to Delhi Police's Training School.

Major sites
Malviya Nagar has two major commercial shopping areas and markets and a speciality hospital. Two of India's biggest and posh malls — Select Citywalk and DLF Avenue (Known as DLF Place earlier) — are located in the neighbourhood. Some of the popular brands/restaurants located in Malviya Nagar are Kake Da Hotel, Domino's Pizza, Pizza hut, Nirula's, Haldiram's and The Big Book Box. There are several neighbourhood parks that are popular jogging and running areas. A number of monuments from the era of the Delhi Sultanate are located in Malviya Nagar and are clustered close to the Corner Market. This includes the tomb of Sufi saint Sheikh Yusuf Qattal who lived during the reign of Ibrahim Lodhi and died in 1526-27.

Banks in Malviya Nagar
Malviya Nagar main market houses several nationalised and public sector banks and ATMs including Axis Bank, Syndicate Bank, Punjab National Bank, State Bank of India, ICICI Bank, HDFC Bank, Canara Bank, Vijaya Bank, Kotak Mahindra Bank, Central Bank of India, Citibank, South Indian Bank, Andhra Bank, IDBI Bank, Indian Bank. Some of the foreign banks are Standard Chartered Bank and Deutsche Bank.

Transportation
Malviya Nagar is bordered by two major New Delhi thoroughfares; Sri Aurobindo Marg, which is a primary route connecting Connaught Place and Central Delhi to Gurgaon, and the Outer Ring Road. Malviya Nagar is connected by other parts of New Delhi by Delhi Bus Rapid Transit System bus lines. The bus fare ranges from  5.00 to  15.00. The buses connecting Malviya Nagar are:
Route 413: Mehrauli to Nizamuddin, via Khel Gaon and Kranti Marg.
Route 500: Saket to Shivaji Stadium.
Route 501: Saket to Mori Gate in North Delhi, via Hauz Khas, Yusuf Sarai and AIIMS.
Route 503: Malviya Nagar to Mori Gate in North Delhi, via the Main Market and Corner Market, Hauz Khas, Yusuf Sarai and AIIMS.
Route 512: Ambedkar Nagar via Malviya Nagar, Hauz Khas, etc.
Route 520: Malviya Nagar to Connaught Place, also via the Main Market and Corner Market, Hauz Khas, Yusuf Sarai, and AIIMS.
Routes 503 and 520 terminate at Malviya Nagar.

Autorickshaws and taxis are also available for public transportation. There is an auto-rickshaw stand is at the Main Market and the roundabout near Shivalik Gate (which is also the Bus Depot). Saket is a nearby neighbourhood.

The Delhi Metro Yellow Line to Gurgaon is functional and has a station at Malviya Nagar.

Politics

In the SDMC, Malviya Nagar (ward 63S) is represented by BJP's Nandani Sharma.

Malviya Nagar is a constituency of the Delhi Assembly.  Since 2013, the sitting Member of the Assembly has been Somnath Bharti of the Aam Aadmi Party.

Malviya Nagar is part of the New Delhi (Lok Sabha constituency) currently represented by Member of Parliament Meenakshi Lekhi of BJP.

Malviya Nagar is also the former residence of Kashmiri separatist leader Syed Ali Shah Geelani, where he lives for 3 months each year during winter in Jammu and Kashmir.

References

External links
"Development issues to the fore in Malviya Nagar" The Hindu', Friday 21 November 2008.

Neighbourhoods in Delhi
South Delhi district
Memorials to Madan Mohan Malaviya